The 2012 Lenoir–Rhyne Bears football team represented Lenoir–Rhyne University in the 2012 NCAA Division II football season. They were led by second-year head coach Mike Houston and played their home games at Moretz Stadium. They were a member of the South Atlantic Conference.

Schedule

References

Lenoir-Rhyne
Lenoir–Rhyne Bears football seasons
South Atlantic Conference football champion seasons
Lenoir-Rhyne Bears football